Som Sa-at is a tambon (subdistrict) located in the mid-west region of Det Udom District, in Ubon Ratchathani Province, Thailand. In 2021, it had a population of 10,882 people. Neighbouring subdistricts are (clockwise from the south) 	Non Sombun, Na Kasem, Nong Om, Na Krasaeng, Na Charoen, and Tha Pho Si.

History
Before 1997, Som Sa-ad tambon was governed by its subdistrict council, but such a local government has been promoted to the Subdistrict Administrative Organization of Som Sa-at (องค์การบริหารส่วนตำบลสมสะอาด; Som Sa-at SAO) in February 1997, the first subdistrict member court election happened in May that year.

In 1961, together with the area divided from Kaeng, its western area which consisted of seven villages was split off to form a new subdistrict, Thung Thoeng.

In 1966, together with the area divided from Na Suang and Thung Thoeng, the northern region of the tambon was split to form a new subdistrict, Na Charoen.

Geography
The tambon is located in the mid-west region of the Det Udom district, on the river plain of the Lam Dom Yai River.

Administration
Som Sa-at subdistrict is divided into 12 administrative villages (mubans; หมู่บ้าน), one of which, Muang village, was further divided into two community groups (Mu; หมู่). The entire area is governed by the Subdistrict Administrative Organization of Som Sa-at (องค์การบริหารส่วนตำบลสมสะอาด; Som Sa-at SAO).

The following is a list of the subdistrict's mubans, which roughly correspond to the villages, as of the 2021 census.

References

Tambon of Ubon Ratchathani Province